Jackson Grills, founded in 1999, is based out of Abbotsford, British Columbia.  It is best known for being a specialty manufacturer of quality barbecues, fire features and outdoor kitchen accessories.  Jackson Grills carries three lines of specialty grills, ranging in size from small portable grills to freestanding and built-in barbecues.

Being started in Duncan, British Columbia by Al Jackson, the company has since expanded its geographic reach, with distribution across the United States and Canada, but with a focus on the Western Corridor. In November 2011, the company underwent a change of ownership.  With the company now operating out of Abbotsford, British Columbia, owner Ken Friesen shows plans to expand the company over the upcoming years.

External links
 Corporate Website

References 

Companies based in British Columbia
Abbotsford, British Columbia